Bistolida kieneri, common name : Kiener's cowry,  is a species of sea snail, a cowry, a marine gastropod mollusc in the family Cypraeidae, the cowries.

Subspecies
The following subspecies are recognized :
Bistolida kieneri depriesteri Schilder, 1933
Bistolida kieneri kieneri (Hidalgo, 1906) (synonym : Erronea reductesignata Schilder, 1924)
Bistolida kieneri schneideri Schilder & Schilder, 1938

Description
The basic color of these oval-shaped smooth and shiny shells is whitish, with irregular  greenish or blueish blotches or trasversal bands and brown small brown spots on the edges of both sides. Also the extremities show two larger brown blotches. The base is mainly whitish, with a narrow sinuous aperture with several short teeth. In the living cowries the mantle is very thin and transparent, with short papillae and external antennae.

Distribution
This species and its subspecies can be found in East Africa, in the Indian Ocean and in the western Pacific Ocean, in the seas along Aldabra, Chagos, the Comores, Kenya, Madagascar, the Mascarene Basin, Mauritius, Mozambique, Réunion, the Seychelles, Kenya, Tanzania, South Africa, India, Malaysia, Thailand, Vietnam, Philippines and Samoa.

Habitat
Living cowries can be encountered in tropical shallow water, usually hidden during the day under rocks or corals. As a matter of fact they fear the light and only at dawn or dusk they start feeding on algae or coral polyps.

References

 Burgess, C.M. (1970) -  The Living Cowries. AS Barnes and Co, Ltd. Cranbury, New Jersey

External links
 
 Biolib
 Sea-shell

Cypraeidae
Gastropods described in 1906